Line 1 of Changzhou Metro is a rapid transit line in Changzhou. It connects the two railway stations Changzhou and Changzhou North.

Construction for Line 1 began on 28 October 2014. Line 1 opened on 21 September 2019.

Opening timeline

Stations

References

Rail transport in Jiangsu
Railway lines opened in 2019
1